Estuary Transit District, doing business as 9 Town Transit, is the public transit provider for the Connecticut River Estuary region.  ETD provides public transit bus service through its 9 Town Transit service to the towns of Chester, Clinton, Deep River, Durham, Essex, East Haddam, Haddam, Killingworth, Lyme, Old Lyme, Old Saybrook, and Westbrook, Connecticut. Services are provided to the general public, with no age or disability restrictions. ETD was named the Rural System of the Year in 2011 by the Community Transportation Association of America.

Governance
ETD is a political subdivision of the state of Connecticut created in 1981 under Chapter 103(a) of the Connecticut General Statutes by the towns of Chester, Clinton, Deep River, Essex, Killingworth, Lyme, Old Lyme, Old Saybrook, and Westbrook. Each member town appoints one director to the Board of Directors. The Board of Directors sets policies, establishes budgets, and provides general direction for the district. The votes on the board are weighted based on the town's population. The Board of Directors employs an executive director to manage the day-to-day operations of the district.

Middletown Area Transit merged into the Estuary Transit District on July 1, 2022.

Services
All services are operated under the 9 Town Transit (9TT) name. Services include four deviated-fixed routes and door-to-door demand response transportation. All deviated-fixed routes begin at the Old Saybrook train station except Route 645 where free transfers between routes can be made. Deviated-fixed routes will deviate up to 3/4 mile off the published route for pick-ups or drop-offs. Reservations for off-route trips must be made one day in advance. Any trips along the route do not require reservations and can be made by flagging the bus down anywhere along the route. ETD's ridership has more than doubled since 2008, now providing over 107,000 trips per year.

In August 2018, ETD switched to a new route numbering system, as part of a plan to unite all CTDOT services under one system. They utilize numbers 640-649.

Route 641 - Madison to Old Saybrook
Route 641 is 9TT's oldest and most utilized deviated-fixed route. It operates Monday through Saturday along U.S. Route 1 between the Old Saybrook Train Station and the Scranton Gazebo in Madison. Route 641 serves such points of interest as Clinton Crossing Outlets, Westbrook Tanger Outlets, Water's Edge Resort, Wal-Mart, four grocery stores, four train stations, Old Saybrook's Main Street shopping and dining district, and the Estuary Council of Seniors. It also provides connections to CTtransit Route 201 to New Haven and to the Shore Line East railroad.  In December 2010, an additional evening trip was added and the schedule was improved to provide hourly service. In December 2011, Saturday hours were greatly expanded and connections to CTtransit Route 201 were added. At the end of August 2018, it was renumbered from Route 1 to Route 641.

Route 642 - Chester to Old Saybrook
Route 642 operates Monday through Saturday along Route 154 between the Old Saybrook train station and Chester Center. Route 642 serves such points of interest as Bokum Shopping Plaza, Lawrence and Memorial Medical Center, Essex Village, Centerbrook Industrial Park, Essex Steam Train, Deep River Center, and Chester Center. In December 2010, the hours were greatly expanded on weekdays to accommodate commuters, and connections to the Route 1 were improved. At the end of August 2018, it was renumbered from Route 2 to Route 642.

Route 643 - New London to Old Saybrook
Starting out as Route 3, service began July 6, 2010, providing service along U.S. Route 1 between the Old Saybrook train station and the New London Transportation Center in downtown New London Monday through Friday. It serves such points of interest as the Old Lyme Shopping Center, the Old Lyme Shore, and Old Lyme Senior Center. Free transfers can be made to Southeast Area Transit bus service throughout the Norwich/New London region. In April 2012, the hours were extended to accommodate commuters. At the end of August 2018, it was renumbered from Route 3 to Route 643.

Route 644 - Middletown to Old Saybrook
Starting out as Route 4, service began in June 2009, connecting the Old Saybrook train station to the Middletown Bus Terminal in downtown Middletown Monday through Friday. It serves such points of interest as the Essex and Chester park and ride lots, Chester Center, Higganum Center, Middlesex Community College, Middlesex Hospital, and downtown Middletown. Free connections may be made to Middletown Area Transit and CTtransit Hartford bus services. In April 2012, additional hours were added to fill the mid-day gap that had existed. At the end of August 2018, it was renumbered from Route 4 to Route 644.

Route 645 - Middletown to Madison
Route 645 began operation on August 27, 2018, connecting the Scranton Gazebo in Madison to the Middletown Bus Terminal. Points of interest include the train station in Clinton, Clinton Crossing Mall, Killingworth Town Hall, Haddam High School, Higganum Center (where it connects with Route 644) and Middlesex Community College. Free connections may be made to Middletown Area Transit and CTtransit Hartford bus services.

Dial-A-Ride
For those traveling in areas not served by routes, ETD offers door-to-door demand response service anywhere within Chester, Clinton, Deep River, Durham, Essex, East Haddam, Haddam, Killingworth, Lyme, Old Lyme, Old Saybrook and Westbrook. Service is available Monday through Friday and must be reserved at least one day in advance. Dial-A-Ride is available to the general public with no age restrictions.

Fares
Effective January 2, 2017, cash fares are $1.75 for all bus routes and $3.50 for Dial-A-Ride and off-route trips. Seniors 65+ and people with disabilities pay just $.85 on all routes with a Medicare card or Connecticut statewide reduced fare I.D. Pre-paid fares, such as 10-ride tickets and monthly passes are also available for purchase online, at the main office or at many local supermarkets. Senior citizen residents age 60 and over may ride for a suggested donation of $.85 on-route and $1.75 off-route/Dial-A-Ride by registering with ETD in advance. Transfers to other ETD routes or to connecting bus services are free.

Funding
The district is funded by four main sources, with the majority from the Federal Transit Administration Section and the Connecticut Department of Transportation.

References

External links 

Bus transportation in Connecticut
Transportation in Middlesex County, Connecticut
Transportation in New London County, Connecticut
Transit agencies in Connecticut